Louis Charles "B.W." Stevenson (October 5, 1949 – April 28, 1988) was an American country pop singer and musician, working in a genre now called progressive country. "B.W." stood for "Buckwheat". Stevenson was born in Dallas, Texas, United States, and attended W.H. Adamson High School with other musicians Michael Martin Murphey, Ray Wylie Hubbard, and Larry Groce.

Stevenson performed and was taped for the intended pilot of Austin City Limits on October 13, 1974. However, the recording quality was deemed too poor to broadcast. Willie Nelson's performance taped the following night was aired as the first episode of the program.

"My Maria"
Stevenson's biggest hit was "My Maria", co-written with Daniel Moore. Lindy Blaskey, Moore's music publisher at ABC/Dunhill Records heard Daniel's one verse and chorus of "My Maria" but Moore thought it was too bubble-gum sounding.  Lindy Blaskey gave the verse and chorus to B.W. Stevenson and asked him to write an additional verse.  When finished, David Kershenbaum,  Stevenson's producer at RCA Records, agreed with Lindy Blaskey that the song sounded like a hit. "My Maria" reached No. 9 on the Billboard Hot 100 for the week ending September 29, 1973, and was covered later by Brooks & Dunn, for whom it was a three-week No. 1 country hit in mid-1996. Among Stevenson's other singles are "The River of Love" (No. 53), another Moore song; "Down to the Station" (No. 82); and the original version of Daniel Moore's "Shambala" (No. 66). A cover version of "Shambala" by Three Dog Night, reached No. 3.

Stevenson recorded one contemporary Christian album titled Lifeline, produced by Chris Christian, his neighbor in Beverly Hills, and it had success on Christian radio with the hit "Headin' Home". His album Rainbow Down the Road was completed posthumously and included a duet with Willie Nelson on "Heart of the Country". Author Jan Reid devotes a chapter to Stevenson in his book The Improbable Rise of Redneck Rock, dubbing him "The Voice".

Death
Stevenson died following heart valve surgery after developing a staph infection at the age of 38. Since his death, Poor David's Pub in Dallas has held an annual songwriting competition in his memory.

Discography
1972 B.W. Stevenson (RCA)
1972 Lead Free (RCA)
1973 My Maria (RCA)
1974 Calabasas (RCA)
1975 We Be Sailin''' (Warner Bros)
1977 The Best of B.W. Stevenson (RCA)
1977 Lost Feeling (Warner Bros)
1980 Lifeline (Home Sweet Home Records)
1990 Rainbow Down the Road (Amazing Records)
2000 Very Best of B.W. Stevenson (Collectables)
2003 Lead Free/B.W. Stevenson (Collectables)
2003 My Maria/Calabasas (Collectables)
2005 We Be Sailin'/Lost Feeling (Collectables)
2013 Southern Nights (Ameritz Music Ltd)
2018 Encore'' (Pedernales Records)

See also
 List of 1970s one-hit wonders in the United States

References

External links
Oldies.com bio

Bio of B.W.Stevenson including cause of death

L'Epopea del Country Rock

1949 births
1988 deaths
Musicians from Dallas
American country singer-songwriters
American male singer-songwriters
20th-century American singers
Place of birth missing
Place of death missing
Singer-songwriters from Texas
RCA Records artists
People from Oak Cliff, Texas
Country musicians from Texas
20th-century American male singers